Raymond Hoorelbeke (born 3 January 1930) is a French former professional racing cyclist. He rode in eight editions of the Tour de France.

References

External links
 

1930 births
Living people
French male cyclists
Sportspeople from Pas-de-Calais
Cyclists from Hauts-de-France